
Gmina Skalbmierz is an urban-rural gmina (administrative district) in Kazimierza County, Świętokrzyskie Voivodeship, in south-central Poland.

Villages
Apart from the town of Skalbmierz, Gmina Skalbmierz contains the villages and settlements of Baranów, Bełzów, Bolowiec, Boszczynek, Drożejowice, Grodzonowice, Kobylniki, Kózki, Krępice, Małoszów, Podgaje, Przybenice, Rosiejów, Sielec Biskupi, Sielec-Kolonia, Sietejów, Szarbia Zwierzyniecka, Szczekarzów, Tempoczów-Kolonia, Tempoczów-Rędziny, Topola, Zakrzów and Zakrzówek.

Neighbouring gminas
Gmina Skalbmierz is bordered by the gminas of Czarnocin, Działoszyce, Kazimierza Wielka, Pałecznica and Racławice.

References
Polish official population figures 2006

Skalbmierz
Kazimierza County